Perspicacity (also called perspicaciousness) is a penetrating discernment (from the Latin perspicācitās, meaning throughsightedness, discrimination)—a clarity of vision or intellect which provides a deep understanding and insight. It takes the concept of wisdom deeper in the sense that it denotes a keenness of sense and intelligence applied to insight. It has been described as a deeper level of internalization. Another definition refers to it as the "ability to recognize subtle differences between similar objects or ideas".

The artist René Magritte illustrated the quality in his 1936 painting Perspicacity. The picture shows an artist at work who studies his subject intently: it is an egg. But the painting which he is creating is not of an egg; it is an adult bird in flight.

Perspicacity is also used to indicate practical wisdom in the areas of politics and finance.  Being perspicacious about other people, rather than having false illusions, is a sign of good mental health. The quality is needed in  psychotherapists who engage in person-to-person dialogue and counselling of the mentally ill.   

Perspicacity is different from acuity, which also describes a keen insight, since it does not include physical abilities such as sight or hearing.

In an article dated October 7, 1966, the journal Science discussed NASA scientist-astronaut program recruitment efforts:

Concept
In 17th-century Europe, René Descartes devised systematic rules for clear thinking in his work Regulæ ad directionem ingenii (Rules for the direction of natural intelligence). In Descartes' scheme, intelligence consisted of two faculties: perspicacity, which provided an understanding or intuition of distinct detail; and sagacity, which enabled reasoning about the details in order to make deductions. Rule 9 was De Perspicacitate Intuitionis (On the Perspicacity of Intuition). He summarised the rule as  

In his study of the elements of wisdom, the modern psychometrician Robert Sternberg identified perspicacity as one of its six components or dimensions; the other five being reasoning, sagacity, learning, judgement and the expeditious use of information. In his analysis, the perspicacious individual is someone who

See also
Neuro-linguistic programming
Organizational politics
Stress management
Time management
Personality
Temperament

References

Concepts in epistemology
Intellectualism
Philosophy of mind
Virtue